Episcopal Church may refer to various churches in the Anglican, Methodist and Open Episcopal traditions.

An episcopal church has bishops in its organisational structure (see episcopal polity). Episcopalian is a synonym for Anglican in Scotland, the United States and several other locations.

Anglicanism

Anglican Communion 
 Episcopal Church (United States) in the United States, Honduras, Taiwan, Colombia, Ecuador, Haiti, the Dominican Republic, Venezuela, the British Virgin Islands and parts of Europe

 Scottish Episcopal Church

 Igreja Episcopal Anglicana do Brasil (Brazil)
 Iglesia Episcopal de Cuba
 Episcopal Church in Jerusalem and the Middle East
 Episcopal Church in the Philippines
 Spanish Reformed Episcopal Church
 Episcopal Church of the Sudan
 Episcopal Church of Taiwan

Continuing Anglican Movement 
 Anglican Episcopal Church, U.S.
 Episcopal Missionary Church, U.S.
 Traditional Protestant Episcopal Church, U.S.
 Southern Episcopal Church, U.S.
 United Episcopal Church of North America, U.S.

Independent Anglican
 Free Protestant Episcopal Church, North America
 Reformed Episcopal Church, North and South America, Asia, Europe. Now closely associated with some of the Continuing Anglican churches.

Lutheranism
Church of Norway

Methodism

Methodist 

 African Methodist Episcopal Church, U.S.
 African Methodist Episcopal Zion Church, North America
 Christian Methodist Episcopal Church, North America
 the former Methodist Episcopal Church, now part of the United Methodist Church

Convergence Movement 
 Charismatic Episcopal Church
 Communion of Evangelical Episcopal Churches

Independent Catholic

Independent Catholic (inter-denominational)
 Open Episcopal Church
 Apostolic Sacramental Church

See also
 St. Thomas Evangelical Church of India
 Anglicanism
 Continuing Anglican movement
 Convergence Movement
 Church of England
 Church of Ireland
 Episcopal polity
 Lutheranism
 Methodism
 Roman Catholic Church
 Eastern Orthodox Church
 Oriental Orthodox Church

Anglican Communion church bodies
Continuing Anglican movement
Ecclesiology
Christian terminology